WSIX-FM (97.9 MHz, "The Big 98") is a radio station licensed to serve Nashville, Tennessee. Owned by iHeartMedia, the station broadcasts a country music format. WSIX's studios are located in Nashville's Music Row district and the transmitter site is in Forest Hills, Tennessee.

History

Countrypolitan
Originally the sister station of a similarly-styled AM station (now WYFN which simulcasts the Bible Broadcasting Network's religious programming), WSIX-FM is credited with pioneering the "countrypolitan" "Nashville sound" of country music, which developed in the 1960s. Violins and other stringed instruments (and occasionally horns) were added to the traditionally fiddle- and guitar-driven sound of country music. During those years (beginning in 1967 until the late 1970s) WSIX-FM used the slogan "We're metropolitan country." As such, WSIX-FM became one of the first successful country-formatted stations on the FM dial in the U.S., as country music formats were typically found on AM stations until well into the early 1980s.

The Big 98 Era
In 1983, then-owners General Electric sold the AM and FM stations, along with WNGE-TV (now WKRN-TV), to other interests. Around that time, the stations were simulcast and the format turned to a more straightforward country sound (i.e., honkey tonk and "Outlaw.")

XM simulcast
From May 1, 2006 to August 8, 2008, WSIX-FM was simulcast on XM Satellite Radio (channel 161). The satellite feed included commercials. A song that was not on the station's playlist at the moment would play during commercial breaks as well.

After a leave of absence, on June 8, 2011, WSIX-FM returned to the XM platform, replacing "Nashville" on XM 57. Station owner Clear Channel Communications (now iHeartMedia) sold off its ownership stake in Sirius XM Radio during the second quarter of fiscal year 2013.  As a result of the sale, nine of Clear Channel's eleven XM stations, including the simulcast of WSIX-FM, ceased broadcast over XM Satellite Radio on October 18, 2013.

HD Radio
WSIX-FMHD2 launched with a new country format, branded as WSIXtra and later The Nashville Channel. In August 2014, it was replaced by No Shoes Radio, which featured a freeform format curated and hosted by country musician Kenny Chesney. It was also available nationally on iHeartRadio and sister station KNIX-FM. In March 2016, it was announced that the channel would move exclusively to SiriusXM on April 12. On April 1, 2016, the channel was replaced by The Bobby Bones Top 30 Countdown.

On September 2, 2016, WSIX-FMHD2 relaunched as the classic country station 98.3 The Big Legend, simulcasting on translator station 98.3 W252CM, On September 21, 2018, the subchannel and translator flipped to a simulcast of talk radio WLAC. The Big Legend is currently heard on the HD3 subchannel.

Emergency Alert System
WSIX is the Local Primary 1 (LP1) station for the Emergency Alert System in the Nashville, Tennessee operational area.

See also
List of Nashville media

References

External links

Country radio stations in the United States
SIX-FM
SIX-FM
IHeartMedia radio stations